Caleb Merrill Wright (October 7, 1908 – May 12, 2001) was a United States district judge of the United States District Court for the District of Delaware.

Education and career

Born in Georgetown, Delaware, Wright received a Bachelor of Arts degree from the University of Delaware in 1930 and a Bachelor of Laws from Yale Law School in 1933. He was in private practice in Georgetown from 1933 to 1955, also serving as a deputy state attorney general of Delaware from 1935 to 1939 and an attorney to the Delaware Senate from 1938 to 1939, and to the Delaware General Assembly from 1940 to 1941.

Federal judicial service

On July 1, 1955, Wright was nominated by President Dwight D. Eisenhower to a new seat on the United States District Court for the District of Delaware created by 68 Stat. 8. He was confirmed by the United States Senate on July 19, 1955, and received his commission on July 27, 1955. He served as Chief Judge from 1957 to 1973, assuming senior status on October 8, 1973. Wright's service was terminated on May 12, 2001, due to his death.

References

Sources
 

1908 births
2001 deaths
People from Georgetown, Delaware
University of Delaware alumni
Yale Law School alumni
Judges of the United States District Court for the District of Delaware
United States district court judges appointed by Dwight D. Eisenhower
20th-century American judges